{
  "type": "FeatureCollection",
  "features": [
    {
      "type": "Feature",
      "properties": {},
      "geometry": {
        "type": "Point",
        "coordinates": [
          18.861293834634125,
          47.72269689561978
        ]
      }
    }
  ]
}

The Visegrád Mountains (Hu: Visegrádi hegység) is a mountain range in Hungary, not far from Budapest.

Geography 
The Visegrád Mountains are the direct northern neighbour of the Pilis Mountains. Although the two ranges form a geographical unit as both of them officially belong to the Transdanubian Mountains, the Visegrád Mountains connect to Börzsöny and the North Hungarian Mountains. The mountain range is the  southernmost part of the Inner Western Carpathians. The basic rock of these mountains is volcanic, mainly andesite, while the Transdanubian Mountains are based on sedimentary rocks.

Geology 
Visegrád Mountains were shaped by volcanic events.

History of the region 

The whole range served as the hunting area for the medieval kings.

Notable locations 
The highest peak of the range is at Dobogókő (699 m above sea level), a hiking and ski resort area with a panoramic view on the Danube Bend.

Other notable places include:

Gallery

References 

Transdanubian Mountains